George Borg may refer to:

George Borg (judge) (1887–1954), Chief Justice of Malta
George August Borg (1888–1969), American businessman and politician
George M. Borg (1934–1971), American politician

See also
George Borg Olivier (1911–1980), Maltese politician